The 1983 German Open was a men's tennis tournament played on outdoor clay courts at Am Rothenbaum in Hamburg, West Germany that was part of the 1983 Grand Prix circuit. It was the 75th edition of the event and took place from 9 May through 14 May 1983. Sixth-seeded Yannick Noah won the singles title.

Finals

Singles
 Yannick Noah defeated  José Higueras, 3–6, 7–5, 6–2, 6–0
 It was Noah's 2nd singles title of the year and the 13th of his career.

Doubles
 Heinz Günthardt /  Balázs Taróczy defeated  Mark Edmondson /  Brian Gottfried, 7–6, 4–6, 6–4

References

External links
   
 ATP tournament profile
 ITF tournament edition details

German Open
Hamburg European Open
1983 in West German sport
German